Protemblemaria is a genus of chaenopsid blennies found in the eastern Pacific as well as the western Atlantic oceans.

Species
There are currently three recognized species in this genus:
 Protemblemaria bicirrus (Hildebrand, 1946) (Warthead blenny)
 Protemblemaria perla Hastings, 2001
 Protemblemaria punctata Cervigón, 1966

References

 
Chaenopsidae
Taxonomy articles created by Polbot